Hot and sour noodles is a dish which comes from Sichuan, China and is a popular part of Sichuan cuisine. The noodles are made from starch derived from peas, potato, sweet potato, or rice.

History 
It is unclear when and who invented the dish, which had been very popular in at least the Qin dynasty, and was initially mostly served as street food in Sichuan. 

After instant noodles were invented in Japan, the same method was introduced for hot and sour noodles in Sichuan. One example is Baijia Instant Noodles.

Characteristics 
Its unique flavor combines the sourness from Chinese rice vinegar with the spiciness from chili pepper oil. Ground toasted peanuts and soybeans on top of the noodles add crispness. Besides rice vinegar, chili oil and peanuts/soybeans, other ingredients include sugar, salt, soy sauce, scallion pieces, and smashed garlic.

Preparation 
The preparation for hot and sour noodles is relatively easy and quick. For street vendors in Sichuan, it only takes 2–3 minutes to serve the noodles after taking customers' orders. Noodles are simmered in boiling water, and then added to a bowl in which rice vinegar, soy sauce, salt, sugar and chili oil have been placed.  The dish is garnished with peanuts or soybeans and scallion pieces on top of the noodles.

See also
Hot and sour soup

References

Fuchsia Dunlop. Land of Plenty : A Treasury of Authentic Sichuan Cooking. New York: W.W. Norton, 2003. .
Fuchsia Dunlop. Shark's Fin and Sichuan Pepper: A Sweet-Sour Memoir of Eating in China. (New York: Norton, 2008). . The author's experience and observations, especially in Sichuan.

Sichuan cuisine
Chinese noodle dishes